The 2022 Fukushima gubernatorial election was held on 30 October 2022 to elect the Governor of  Fukushima Prefecture. Incumbent Masao Uchibori was re-elected for another term.

Candidates 
All candidates were independents, although received support from established political parties.
 Yoshiaki Kusano (endorsed by JCP)
 Sho Takahashi
 Masao Uchibori (incumbent; endorsed by LDP, Komeito, CDP, DPFP)

Results

References 

2022 elections in Japan
Fukushima gubernational elections
Politics of Fukushima Prefecture
October 2022 events in Japan